Kamayani Express (train nos 11071/11072) is a daily Express train run by Indian Railways between Mumbai Lokmanya Tilak Terminus and Banaras. It is the only train of Central Railways that runs from Mumbai to Banaras via Bhopal. Kamayani Express coaches are converted from ICF coach to new LHB coach.

On 4 August 2015, this train was involved in this Harda twin train derailment in Madhya Pradesh.

Service and schedule

Route and stations
This train passes through 43 intermediate stations including , Nashik Road, ,Raver ,  and Prayagraj Junction.

Coach and rake
Kamayani Express has no rake-sharing arrangement with any other trains. The train is pulled by WAP-7 from Mumbai Lokmanya Tilak Terminus to Banaras and vice versa. The train has 11 sleeper, 4 Third AC,1 Second AC,1 First AC conditioned and 2 general class coaches.

Accident

4 August 2015: The Kamayani Express and the Rajendra Nagar–Lokmanya Tilak Terminus Janta Express overturn at the same spot in Madhya Pradesh on 4 August 2015. Because of same around 25 people have killed.

In this critical incident where the Kamayani Express from Mumbai to Varanasi and the Patna to Mumbai Janata Express overturned close to the Kudawa railway station, about 30 kilometers from the basic Harda district of the southwestern Madhya Pradesh, around 25 people have died and more than 50 were injured.

The accident takes place around midnight at the bridge number 648/1 that is on the Machan River, where the level of water was really high because of heavy rainfall. After cutting off the derailed coaches, the Kamayani Express was taken to the closest station that is Bhirangi railway station.

More than 300 Kamayani Express passengers were rescued after this major accident. As per the officer, six coached of this Kamayani Express and three coaches along with the engine of Janata Express were derailed on 4 August, Tuesday night.

The Prime Minister Narendra Modi and Railway PRO have announced that the deceased families will get around ₹2 lakh as exgratia and those who are injured badly will get around ₹50000 from the Central Government. Those who have minor injuries will also get ₹25000.

References

External links
 12681 Time Table & Live Train Status
 12682 Time Table & Live Train Status

Named passenger trains of India
Rail transport in Maharashtra
Rail transport in Madhya Pradesh
Passenger trains originating from Varanasi
Transport in Mumbai
Express trains in India